Radek Haman (born 22 December 1969) is a Czech professional ice hockey center who most recently played with HC Breclav of the Czech 4, Liga. He has played the majority of his career in the Czech Republic, most notably with HC Kometa Brno and Orli Znojmo before finishing his Czech Extraliga career with HC Plzeň during the 2010–11 Czech Extraliga season.

Haman previously played for HC Olomouc, HC Kometa Brno and HC Znojemští Orli.

References

External links

1969 births
Living people
Czech ice hockey forwards
HC Kometa Brno players
HC Olomouc players
Orli Znojmo players
HC Plzeň players
People from Žďár nad Sázavou
Sportspeople from the Vysočina Region
Czechoslovak ice hockey forwards